James Wallis is a British designer and publisher of tabletop and role-playing games.

He is not to be confused with Myriador's Jamie Wallis, who converted Steve Jackson's Sorcery! into d20 modules.

Career
James Wallis began roleplaying in 1981 through Dungeons & Dragons and Traveller, which were both licensed in the UK by Games Workshop at the time. Wallis began publishing his own fanzines, first WEREMAN and then Sound & Fury, and got to know game designer Erick Wujcik through the latter; Wujcik introduced Wallis to Kevin Siembieda at Gen Con 22 in 1989, resulting in Wallis writing two books for Palladium Books, Mutants in Avalon (1990) and Mutants in Orbit (1992). Wallis also began working on his own role-playing game based on the Bugtown comics, and in 1992 he brought the game to Phage Press, where it stalled for two years due to creative differences. Once Upon a Time, a game designed by James Wallis, Andrew Rilstone and Richard Lambert, was published by Atlas Games in 1993, where James met Jonathan Tweet, who soon became head of RPGs at Wizards of the Coast; Wallis brought his Bugtown game to Wizards, but he found no success there either as cartoonist Matt Howarth was unable to come to an agreement with Wizards of the Coast regarding royalties. He co-founded the RPG magazine Inter*action with Andrew Rilstone, the first issue of which was published in Summer 1994.

In October 1994, Wallis founded Hogshead Publishing, a company which specialised in role-playing and storytelling games. Wallis based the company in the UK, and got a license from Phil Gallagher at Games Workshop to publish books for Warhammer Fantasy Roleplay. Wallis and Rilstone changed the name of Inter*action to Interactive Fantasy due to trademark concerns beginning with its second issue, which was also Hogshead's first publication; the magazine only lasted two more issues after that. Warhammer sold well, but Hogshead had problems with their distributor, and Wallis had to let go of all the company's staff. Matt Howarth eventually pulled Wallis' license for Bugtown, and the game was never published. By 1996, Wallis was also working in the computer industry and shortly after moved into magazine publishing, working on Warhammer in his spare bedroom on evenings and weekends. By the end of 1997, cashflow had improved so Wallis moved the company to an office, and hired Matthew Pook. Wallis was able to publish his game The Extraordinary Adventures of Baron Munchausen in 1998. He helped the principals of ProFantasy Software resurrect the Dragonmeet convention in 2000.

On 26 November 2002, Wallis announced that he was ending Hogshead Publishing, and Mark Ricketts bought the company name in February 2003. Wallis started the company Magnum Opus Press in 2007 by getting a licensing for the RPG Dragon Warriors; Magnum Opus published a new 1.1 edition of the game with supplements starting in 2008 before problems with the licensor ended it on 1 April 2011. Wallis put out other books through Magnum Opus, including the debut novel Game Night (2007) by Jonny Nexus, and a new edition of his own The Extraordinary Adventures of Baron Munchausen (2008).

Wallis is a narrative media consultant, creating online games for clients including the BBC, the U.K. Home Office, and Endemol Television. He lives in London with his wife and children.

He has also created games and books for other publishers, including the award-winning card game Once Upon A Time, which he co-authored with Richard Lambert and Andrew Rilstone. In 2001, he founded the annual Diana Jones Award for "excellence in gaming". He currently runs the gaming consultancy Spaaace, which includes the publishing subsidiary Magnum Opus Press, and his personal blog, Cope.

In January 2013 Wallis launched a Kickstarter for a RPG called Alas Vegas. A PDF download was released to backers in December 2016, and the physical book was published in November 2017.

Games
James Wallis's published games include:

 Once Upon A Time, co-authored with Richard Lambert and Andrew Rilstone (first released in 1994; named as winner of Games magazine's Best Family Card Game section in the 1997 Games 100 list and one of "The Millennium's Best Card Games" by Pyramid magazine)
 The Extraordinary Adventures of Baron Munchausen (first released in 1998, revised and expanded in 2008; named as one of "The Millennium's Best Games" by Pyramid magazine, nominated for the 2009 Origins Award for "Best Children's, Family or Party Game")

Games he has edited and/or published include:

 Nobilis (second edition, 2002; winner of the Origins Award for "Best Graphic Presentation Book Format Product", 2002)

Writing and Periodicals
In 1994 he founded and published Interactive Fantasy (IF), an early journal of 'games design and criticism'. The editor was Andrew Rilstone. The second issue included the first printing of the essay 'I Have No Words And I Must Design' by Greg Costikyan.

He wrote for the British Sunday Times newspaper from 2000 to 2001.

He also co-wrote scripts for the television show 404 Not Found.

References

External links
 Spaaace, the games consultancy
 COPE, James Wallis's personal blog
 "First Church Of James Wallis Sanctified", part of the webzine Critical Miss
 Magnum Opus Press

British bloggers
Place of birth missing (living people)
Year of birth missing (living people)
Board game designers
Role-playing game designers
Living people